Francis Joseph Broadhurst (–1999), sometimes called Frank Broadhurst, was an Australian commercial artist who worked as a caricaturist, illustrator, painter and designer. He was born and trained in Melbourne, but achieved his greatest success in Sydney.

Life 
Francis Joseph Broadhurst was born in Melbourne in about 1914. He trained for five years at the National Gallery of Victoria Art School under Napier Waller. 

He was the theatrical caricaturist for the Melbourne magazine Table Talk in 1936. He moved to Sydney in 1937, and was employed by the Australian Consolidated Press as a caricaturist on the Sydney Daily Telegraph and an illustrator on the Australian Women's Weekly. 

He is perhaps best known for his fine art illustrations to editions of Gargantua and Pantagruel and The Decameron published by Angus & Robertson. Twelve of the original pen drawings for the edition of Rabelais were purchased by the Art Gallery of New South Wales in 1949. The review in the Sydney Sun was full of praise:It is refreshing to find in Francis Broadhurst an Australian artist who follows the precedent set by Gustave Dore, Norman Lindsay, Heath Robinson and other famous moderns in illustrating the classic masterpieces. Broadhurst has already displayed his brilliance as an illustrator by his drawings for Boccaccio's Decameron. In this large and beautifully-produced version of Gargantua and Pantagruel … he shows how finely his talent has developed. … This is certainly the greatest single work of illustration by an Australian artist since Norman Lindsay's best.Later he turned to book design, and created the dusk jacket to Patricia Rolfe's The Journalistic Javelin (1979).

He died in Sydney on 3 August 1999.

Works

Collections 

 Mitchell Library, State Library of New South Wales, Sydney, NSW.
 Art Gallery of New South Wales, Sydney, NSW.

Illustrated books 

 Boccaccio: The Decameron. Translated by J. M. Rigg. Illustrated by Francis J. Broadhurst. Sydney: Angus and Robertson, 1941.
 Rabelais: The Heroic Deeds of Gargantua and Pantagruel. Illustrated by Francis J. Broadhurst. Sydney: Angus and Robertson, 1951.
 Henry Turnbull: Leichhardt's Second Journey: A First-hand Account. Illustrations by Francis J. Broadhurst. Sydney: Halstead Press, 1983.

Notes

References 
 Beyer, Andreas; Savoy, Bénédicte; and Tegethoff, Wolf, eds. (2021). "Broadhurst, Francis J.". In Allgemeines Künstlerlexikon. De Gruyter.
 Riddler, Eric (11 September 2017). "Francis J. Broadhurst". Design & Art Australia Online (DAAO). Australian Research Council.
 Rolfe, Patricia (1979). The Journalistic Javelin: an illustrated history of the Bulletin. Sydney, NSW: Wildcat Press; Gladesville, NSW: Golden Press.
 "Francis Broadhurst (1914–1999)". Australian Prints + Printmaking. 10 September 2013. National Gallery of Australia. Gordon Darling Print Fund.
 "Francis Joseph Broadhurst. 1914-99 Australia". Australian and New Zealand Art Sales Digest. John Furphy Pty. Ltd., Melbourne, Australia.
 "Works by Francis J Broadhurst". Art Gallery of New South Wales. Retrieved 28 April 2022.

Reviews 

 "Australian Edition Of The Decameron". The Mail. 22 November 1941. p. 21. 
 "After porridge came the caviare job". The Sun. 21 December 1941. p. 26.
 "Reading Guide: The Works Of Rabelais". The Sun. 1 September 1951. p. 4.
 "An Australian Rabelais: Francis J. Broadhurst's Illustrations". The Age. 22 September 1951. p. 7. 
 "Let's Talk About Books (by B.G.S.)". The Southern Mail. 12 October 1951. p. 6. 
 "Broadhurst As An Illustrator". The Sydney Morning Herald. 1 December 1951. p. 2.

External links 

 Mullen, Chris (25 March 2012). "Francis Broadhurst, Boccaccio, The Decameron 1956". The Visual Telling of Stories. Retrieved 28 April 2022.
 "Francis Broadhurst". MutualArt.com. MutualArt Group. Retrieved 28 April 2022.

1914 births
1999 deaths
20th-century Australian male artists
Australian illustrators
20th-century Australian artists